Jacques Touchet was a French illustrator. His first book, "Croquis d'un Prisonnier de Guerre" was published in 1917. He illustrated numerous French books, until the early fifties.

Publications

Touchet, Jacques
Year of birth missing
Year of death missing